Durban United  FC was a South African football club based in Durban.
Durban United FC won the Castle Cup in  1972 and played in the final in 1977.

Durban Spurs merged with Durban United into Durban Spurs United for 1970; the merger club soon reverted its name to Durban United.
When the NFL folded after the 1977 season, the club joined the FPL under the name Suburbs United. Despite finishing runners-up to Durban City in the 14-team league, the club disbanded at the close of the 1978 season.

See also
 National Football League (South Africa)

External links
expro.co.za
Edward Mulheron(D) (1970–1973) 45 app

Soccer clubs in Durban
National Football League (South Africa) clubs
1970 establishments in South Africa